Christopher Peter Womersley (born 7 January 1949) is an alpine skier from New Zealand.

He competed for New Zealand at the 1972 Winter Olympics at Sapporo, and came 41st in the downhill and 35th in the giant slalom, but did not qualify in the slalom. He went to the  1968 Winter Olympics at Grenoble, but did not compete.

He is a brother of 1960 alpine skier Cecilia Womersley.

References 
 Black Gold by Ron Palenski (2008, 2004 New Zealand Sports Hall of Fame, Dunedin) p. 108,110

External links 
 
 

Living people
1949 births
New Zealand male alpine skiers
Olympic alpine skiers of New Zealand
Alpine skiers at the 1972 Winter Olympics